Faxonius stannardi, the Little Wabash Crayfish, is a species of crayfish in the family Cambaridae. It is endemic to Illinois. The common name refers to the Little Wabash River, where the original specimens were found.

References

External links

Cambaridae
Fauna of the United States
Endemic fauna of Illinois
Freshwater crustaceans of North America
Crustaceans described in 1985
Taxobox binomials not recognized by IUCN